Larned is a city in and the county seat of Pawnee County, Kansas, United States.  As of the 2020 census, the population of the city was 3,769.

History
Larned was laid out in 1873. The first post office was established at Larned in 1872.

The city drew its name from nearby Fort Larned, which operated from 1859 to 1878 and was named for Colonel Benjamin F. Larned, U.S. Army Paymaster from July 1854 to his death September 6, 1862.

Geography
Larned is located at coordinates 38.1805693, -99.0987130.

Climate
The climate in this area is characterized by hot, humid summers and generally mild to cool winters.  According to the Köppen Climate Classification system, Larned has a humid subtropical climate, abbreviated "Cfa" on climate maps.

Demographics

2010 census
As of the census of 2010, there were 4,054 people, 1,824 households, and 1,027 families residing in the city. The racial makeup of the city was 92.2% White, 2.7% African American, 0.4% Native American, 0.6% Asian, 0.1% Pacific Islander, 1.4% from other races, and 2.6% from two or more races. Hispanic or Latino of any race were 7.0% of the population.

There were 1,824 households, of which 27.0% had children under the age of 18 living with them, 42.1% were married couples living together, 10.5% had a female householder with no husband present, 3.7% had a male householder with no wife present, and 43.7% were non-families. 39.5% of all households were made up of individuals, and 18.6% had someone living alone who was 65 years of age or older. The average household size was 2.18 and the average family size was 2.89.

The median age in the city was 42.7 years. 23.9% of residents were under the age of 18; 6.8% were between the ages of 18 and 24; 21.9% were from 25 to 44; 27.9% were from 45 to 64; and 19.7% were 65 years of age or older. The gender makeup of the city was 48.0% male and 52.0% female.

2000 census
As of the census of 2000, there were 4,236 people, 1,826 households, and 1,113 families residing in the city. The racial makeup of the city was 90.91% White, 3.75% African American, 0.97% Native American, 0.76% Asian, 1.77% from other races, and 1.84% from two or more races. Hispanic or Latino of any race were 5.38% of the population.

There were 1,826 households, out of which 27.3% had children under the age of 18 living with them, 48.6% were married couples living together, 9.0% had a female householder with no husband present, and 39.0% were non-families. 36.5% of all households were made up of individuals, and 17.8% had someone living alone who was 65 years of age or older. The average household size was 2.20 and the average family size was 2.87.

In the city, the population was spread out, with 23.5% under the age of 18, 6.4% from 18 to 24, 23.3% from 25 to 44, 24.6% from 45 to 64, and 22.1% who were 65 years of age or older. The median age was 43 years. For every 100 females, there were 90.3 males. For every 100 females age 18 and over, there were 87.3 males.

The median income for a household in the city was $33,895, and the median income for a family was $46,776. Males had a median income of $27,138 versus $20,927 for females. The per capita income for the city was $19,936. About 5.9% of families and 7.4% of the population were below the poverty line, including 8.1% of those under age 18 and 10.8% of those age 65 or over.

Education
The community is served by Fort Larned USD 495 public school district.

Media
The local newspaper is Larned Tiller & Toiler.

Economy
 USD 495, local school district
 Larned State Hospital, west of Larned
 Larned Correctional Mental Health Facility, west of Larned

Area attractions
 Santa Fe Trail Center, 1349 K-156 Hwy, museum devoted to the history of the Santa Fe Trail.

Notable people
 Belle Jennings Benchley, "the Zoo lady", former director of the San Diego Zoo
 Gene Keady, current Big Ten sportscaster, former head coach for the Purdue Boilermakers men's basketball team
 Hal Patterson, former professional football player and member of the Canadian Football Hall of Fame
 Glee S. Smith, Jr., former Kansas state legislator and lawyer
 Ralph Terry, retired New York Yankees pitcher, 2× All-Star (1961, 1962), 2× World Series champion (1961, 1962), World Series MVP (1962), AL wins leader (1962), former professional golfer in retirement 
 Mitch Webster, retired Major League Baseball outfielder
 John Zook, former football player, all-state, all Big 8 (University of Kansas), and all-pro NFL player

See also
 National Register of Historic Places listings in Pawnee County
 Fort Larned National Historic Site
 Patterson House
 Santa Fe Trail

References

Further reading

External links

City
 City of Larned
 Larned - Directory of Public Officials
Schools
 USD 495, local school district
Historical
 Fort Larned National Historic Site
 Santa Fe Trail Center
 Historic Passenger Rail service in Pawnee County
 Postcards from Larned
 Historic Images of Larned, Special Photo Collections at Wichita State University Library.
Maps
 Larned city map, KDOT

Kansas populated places on the Arkansas River
Cities in Kansas
County seats in Kansas
Cities in Pawnee County, Kansas